Elsa Harik (née Marston), (March 18, 1933 – February 16, 2017) known professionally as Elsa Marston, is an American author of children's books about the Middle East and North Africa. She died after completing her last book, "I Just Kept Walking."

References

1933 births
2017 deaths
20th-century American women writers
20th-century American writers
American children's writers
21st-century American women